The Association for Music in International Schools, best known as AMIS, is an organization that brings together students of schools worldwide who excel in musical achievements for days of music practice and then conclude with a concert.  The Association also provides professional development through an annual Music Educators' Conference.

The Acronym
The association name Amis is also French for the word friends. The founders of AMIS choose this name with the purpose of the association in mind. Amis symbolizes friendships established by children all over the world who attend AMIS Festivals. AMIS' vision is to create a music festival atmosphere that is a place of learning, laughing and most importantly coming together; this is reflected in its name. Although the association AMIS is based out of the United Kingdom, the association chose a French (as opposed to an English) name to represent the numerous nationalities that participate in and contribute to AMIS festivals all over the world.

Mission statement

“The Association is an international, non-profit, non-sectarian, politically neutral organization dedicated to the promotion of excellence at all levels of music education. Its objectives are to advance the education of school pupils and teachers throughout the world by developing their understanding, knowledge and appreciation of music; to advance the  education of young people and their teachers in global issues and cultural diversity through the performance and study of music; to promote high standards of musical performance in school pupils of all ages and abilities throughout the world; to promote furtherance of educationally valuable music repertoire.”

AMIS Festivals

Once a year, there is a festival for each of the different categories. (See Festival Categories for list). Each festival is hosted by an AMIS Membership school, rotating between them yearly.  To qualify for band, strings, and all High School auditions, students must audition by recordings, which are judged by a blind panel of music educators.  Middle School Choir auditions are conducted by each participating school's teacher.  The successful students travel to the host school and participate in the practice days and the final concert.  The format is usually: travel Wednesday, rehearse Thursday-Saturday, concert Saturday evening, travel home Sunday.

AMIS' member schools mainly lie in Europe and Asia, with some participants in Africa (although at the moment there is one membership school that participates in festivals and hails from Central America).  Founded in London, AMIS slowly grew across Western Europe and now has many festivals reserved only for Asian schools.  Festivals are conducted in English, though due to the participants coming from within international school populations, most students (and many teachers) speak multiple languages. Concert repertoires always include multiple languages; and concert speeches and introductions are usually held in the (festival's) host country's language in addition to English. (For example: The 2014 European Middle School Honor Girls’ Choir, hosted in Stavanger, Norway, had concert services conducted in Norwegian as well as English.)

Conductors

AMIS selects a different conductor for each festival. Often, conductors are teachers in international schools who are well respected and recommended by their peers.  At the high school level, the Association contracts premiere conductors from around the world.

Music

The repertoire style depends on the AMIS festival and the songs that the conductor wants to play. Many times, AMIS has commissioned works by authors, making the band/choir present world-premiere songs. Such authors include Philip Sparke, David Brunner, Dr. Richard Prior, Christopher Marshall, and more.

Festival Categories

AMIS presents a multitude of different yearly festivals focused on different music, instrumentation, and musicians. These are:
 High School Honor Band
 High School Honor Orchestra
 High School Honor Mixed Choir
 High School Honor Women's Choir
 High School Honor Men's Choir
 Honor Jazz Band and Vocal Jazz Ensemble
 Solo and Ensemble Festival
 European Middle School Honor Band
 Asian Middle School Honor Band
 Middle School Honor Mixed Choir
 European Middle School Honor Girls’ Choir
 Asian Middle School Honor Girls' Choir
 European Middle School Honor Boys’ Choir
 Asian Middle School Honor Boys’ Choir
 European Middle School Honor Orchestra
 Asian Middle School Honor Orchestra

References

Administrative Team
 Executive Director: Keith Montgomery
 Chief Operating Officer: Tim Germann
 AMIS Consultant: Georgia Bassett
 Board of Trustees: Lisa Ross, Cindy Bulteel, James Libbey, Carolyn Stock-Chapin, Rhonda Schwartz, Bill Gilfry, Bonnie Reinitzer, Julie Buell Lodi, Richard Bassett

External links
AMIS Official Website
AMIS International Honor Choir 2008 - Beautiful City
AMIS International Honor Band & Choir 2008 - Better is Peace

Music festivals staged internationally